Al Qassar (also spelled to as Al Gassar) is a seafront district on Qatar's eastern coast, located in the municipality of Ad Dawhah.

In the 2015 census it formed Zone 61 with Al Dafna and Zone 66 with Onaiza and Leqtaifiya.

Etymology
In Arabic, qassar is a word used for small black rocks found around beaches. The district received its name because of its high concentration of these rocks.

Geography
Al Qassar borders the following districts:
West Bay Lagoon and Onaiza to the west, separated by Lusail Street.
The Pearl to the east, separated by the Persian Gulf.
Al Dafna to the south, separated by Dafna Street.

Transport
Currently, the underground Al Qassar Metro Station is under construction, having been launched during Phase 1. Once completed, it will be part of Doha Metro's Red Line North.

Archaeology
Al Qassar was found to have rock carvings of human and animals by an excavation team in 1979. Most of them have been eroded beyond recognition. Stone blocks containing still-recognizable carvings were cut off and transported to the Qatar National Museum for preservation.
 
One petroglyph, which contains two different panels carved by more than one individual, depicts two horse riders and a camel. The riders, one behind the other, are holding lances in their upraised hands. The second rider appears to be chasing the first, as his lance is pointed towards the other rider's back. The figure of the second rider is leaning in a forward position, with the lance projecting from his upper body. In front of the riders is a camel with incomplete body features. Archaeologist Muhammad Abdul Nayeem tentatively dated the carving to the second millennium BC.

Gallery

References

Communities in Doha